John Joseph Guiney (June 26, 1882 in Middlesex County, Massachusetts - February 6, 1912 in Bryn Mawr, Pennsylvania) was an American shot putter who placed seventh at the 1904 Summer Olympics.

References

External links 
 Profile at Sports-Reference.com

1882 births
1912 deaths
American male shot putters
Olympic track and field athletes of the United States
Athletes (track and field) at the 1904 Summer Olympics
Sportspeople from Middlesex County, Massachusetts
Track and field athletes from Massachusetts